Steppin' Out is an album by organist Jack McDuff recorded between 1961 and 1966 and released on the Prestige label.

Reception
Allmusic awarded the album 3 stars.

Track listing 
All compositions by Jack McDuff except as indicated
"Shortnin' Bread" (James Whitcomb Riley) - 5:40
"Chicken Feet" - 2:35
"Our Miss Brooks" (Harold Vick) - 10:26
"Shaky" - 5:00
"Godiva Brown" - 5:13
"Moody McDuff" - 6:35
Recorded at Van Gelder Studio in Englewood Cliffs, New Jersey on July 14, 1961 (track 5), January 8, 1963 (tracks 4 & 6) and early 1965 (track 1) and in New York City on July 1964 (track 3) and February 1966 (track 2)

Personnel 
Jack McDuff - organ
Red Holloway (track 3), Harold Ousley (track 2), Harold Vick (track 5) - tenor saxophone
George Benson (track 3), Kenny Burrell as K.B. Groovington (tracks 4 & 6), Grant Green (track 5), Pat Martino (track 2) - guitar
Joe Dukes - drums
Big band arranged and conducted by Benny Golson (track 1)

References 

Jack McDuff albums
1969 albums
Prestige Records albums
Albums arranged by Benny Golson